Kevin George Knipfing (born April 26, 1965), better known by his stage name Kevin James, is an American comedian and actor. In television, James played Doug Heffernan on The King of Queens from 1998 to 2007, and received a Primetime Emmy Award for Outstanding Lead Actor in a Comedy Series nomination for the performance in 2006. He also was nominated for a People's Choice Award in 2017 for a starring role in the CBS sitcom Kevin Can Wait (2016–2018).

James has appeared in the films Hitch (2005), I Now Pronounce You Chuck & Larry (2007), Paul Blart: Mall Cop (2009), Grown Ups (2010), Zookeeper (2011), Here Comes the Boom (2012), and Pixels (2015). He has also done voice work for Monster House, Barnyard (both 2006), and the first three films of the Hotel Transylvania franchise (2012–2018).

Early life
Kevin George Knipfing was born on April 26, 1965, in Mineola, New York. He grew up in Stony Brook, New York. He is the second son of office worker Janet and insurance agency owner Joseph Valentine Knipfing Jr. His father was German-American. James has an elder brother, comedian and actor Gary Valentine, and a sister, Leslie. He and his siblings were raised Catholic. James graduated from Ward Melville High School. While there, he reached the number one spot on the wrestling team, just ahead of friend and future professional wrestler Mick Foley. Both wrestled at the 145 lb weight class. A season-ending back injury to James resulted in Foley taking over the first string position. James, as well as Foley, went on to study at the State University of New York at Cortland, where he played halfback on the varsity football team until another back injury permanently ended his sports hopes.

Career
James began doing stand-up comedy in 1989, making his debut at the East Side Comedy Club on Long Island, managed by Richie Minervini. He gained popularity through numerous appearances on various talk shows, including The Tonight Show with Jay Leno, Late Show with David Letterman, Late Night with Conan O'Brien, Dennis Miller Live, The Late Late Show, The Rosie O'Donnell Show, The Ellen DeGeneres Show, and Live with Regis and Kathie Lee. James was listed at #76 on Comedy Central's list of the 100 Greatest Stand-Up Comedians. James has also done his stand-up routine on Just for Laughs, an annual comedy festival in Montreal, Quebec. Later he was on commercials for Mazzio's Italian Eatery. In 2001, James did his own stand-up special called Kevin James: Sweat the Small Stuff. He has also appeared as a musical guest on Just for Laughs. In 2018, James released another stand-up special on Netflix called Kevin James: Never Don’t Give Up.

Television
James' first television job was in 1991 on The New Candid Camera, where he used his comedy timing and improvisation skills playing the actor that pulled the practical jokes on unsuspecting people. He appeared in A&E's An Evening at the Improv in 1994. James appeared on television as the announcer for the MTV sports game show SandBlast from 1994 to 1996.

James later moved to Los Angeles and befriended Ray Romano, and he guest-starred on a few episodes of Romano's hit CBS sitcom, Everybody Loves Raymond. These appearances led to the development of his own sitcom, The King of Queens, which ran on the same network from September 21, 1998, to May 14, 2007, James played working class parcel delivery man Doug Heffernan who works for a company known as IPS. He is married to Carrie (Leah Remini), a sharp-tongued, ambitious secretary at a Manhattan law firm who is far less content with working-class life in Queens. Her obsessive, vindictive father, Arthur (Jerry Stiller), who is prone toward bizarre conduct, lives with them. For his work on the eighth season, James was nominated for a Primetime Emmy Award for Outstanding Lead Actor in a Comedy Series in 2006.

James hosted the 2010 Nickelodeon Kids' Choice Awards on March 27, 2010. He was nominated to be the inaugural member of the "Arm Fart Hall of Fame" in the following year's show, with host Jack Black calling him Kevin "Not-Quite-As-Good-As-Me" James. He and fellow nominee Kaley Cuoco lost in fan voting to Josh Duhamel.

James starred in the sitcom Kevin Can Wait, which premiered on September 19, 2016. The series was renewed for a second season, before being canceled at the season's end.

In 2021, James released a new show on Netflix called The Crew. It was canceled after one season.

Film

After a cameo in 50 First Dates in 2004, James made his starring film debut in the 2005 romantic comedy Hitch, alongside Will Smith and Eva Mendes. In 2006, he co-starred with his Everybody Loves Raymond colleague Ray Romano in the straight-to-video comedy Grilled, and provided voice work in the animated films Monster House and Barnyard. James co-starred with Adam Sandler in the comedies I Now Pronounce You Chuck & Larry (2007) and You Don't Mess with the Zohan (2008), and starred in the Sandler-produced comedy Paul Blart: Mall Cop (2009). The latter film opened as the #1 film in North America with a weekend gross of $39 million, despite overwhelmingly negative reviews, and eventually grossed $219 million from ticket and home video sales. James also appeared in Grown Ups, which co-starred numerous Saturday Night Live alumni and was even more universally panned, yet was highly successful at the box office.

In 2011, he had a lead role with Vince Vaughn in the comedy-drama The Dilemma and then with Rosario Dawson in Zookeeper, which he wrote and produced. James also had the lead role in the 2012 mixed martial arts comedy film Here Comes the Boom. He starred as well in the movie Pixels in 2015 and the following year in True Memoirs of an International Assassin, directed by Jeff Wadlow and released by Netflix on November 11, 2016. In 2017, James co-starred with Adam Sandler in another Netflix film, Sandy Wexler.

James had a lead dramatic role in the 2020 thriller film Becky. He starred as NFL head coach Sean Payton in the 2022 biographical film Home Team.

Other work

In 2007, he was the grand marshal for the Pepsi 400 promoting I Now Pronounce You Chuck & Larry and saying "Gentlemen, start your engines". He did it again in June 2010 with friend and fellow actor Adam Sandler to promote Grown Ups, in 2012 at the fall Talladega race to promote Here Comes the Boom, and in July 2013 at the Coke-Zero 400 with co-stars Sandler and Shaquille O'Neal to promote Grown Ups 2. Both the 2007 Pepsi 400 command and June 2010 command at Michigan with Sandler have since been voted as two of the best and most memorable NASCAR commands in history by fans.

A web series titled Dusty Peacock produced by James and starring his brother Gary Valentine began streaming on Crackle in July 2009.

In February 2020, James revived his YouTube channel which he had launched back on November 27, 2017 featuring short films "based on thin premises, like James eagerly waiting for a green light, misreading a hand wave, or spending birthdays by himself, but many carry a sense of melancholy and restraint." By June 2020, he had over 535,000 subscribers and 28 million total views.

Personal life

On June 19, 2004, James married actress Steffiana de la Cruz in California. They have four children.

In 2012, James stated that he is a devout Catholic. In 2019, James hosted a retreat featuring Father Chad Ripperger and theologian Scott Hahn.

Filmography

Film

Television

Accolades

Teen Choice Awards

Primetime Emmy Awards

Golden Raspberry Awards

People's Choice Awards

Notes
A  Shared with Will Smith
B  Shared with Adam Sandler and Jessica Biel
C  Shared with the entire cast

References

External links

 
 

1965 births
20th-century American comedians
20th-century American male actors
21st-century American comedians
21st-century American male actors
American male film actors
American male screenwriters
American male television actors
American male voice actors
American Roman Catholics
American stand-up comedians
American television writers
Comedians from New York (state)
Living people
Male actors from New York (state)
American male television writers
American people of German descent
People from Mineola, New York
People from Stony Brook, New York
Screenwriters from New York (state)
State University of New York at Cortland alumni
Television producers from New York (state)
Ward Melville High School alumni